Steven O'Donnell III (born 5 December 1980), better known by his gamer tag and often stage name "Bajo", is a New Zealand-Australian television presenter, actor, and author. He is best known as one of the presenters of the ABC video game programme Good Game from 2007 until its cancellation in 2016; he co-hosted  Good Game: Spawn Point until November 2017, and currently streams on Twitch. O'Donnell was born in New Zealand and grew up on the outskirts of Toowoomba.

Career

Independent film
O'Donnell completed his first lead role in an independent feature called Scratched (DigiSPAA film festival 2005) at the age of 20. He has since appeared in over 40 short films. After moving to Sydney in 2003, O'Donnell was cast in lead roles for the independent films Wango and Malloy and Suburban Boys.

In 2003, O'Donnell played a minor role as a lifeguard in the film Swimming Upstream. In 2005, O'Donnell worked on the feature Almost with Salvatore Coco, Ada Nicodemou and Tony Barry. In 2006, O'Donnell worked on the feature Schooner of Blood.

Television
O'Donnell hosted a live interactive quiz show on the Seven Network called Midnight Zoo in 2006.

O'Donnell joined the ABC show Good Game in 2007, co-hosting alongside Jeremy "Junglist" Ray until 2009, and Stephanie "Hex" Bendixsen from 2009 to the show's cancellation in 2016. He also co-hosted the show Good Game: Spawn Point, alongside Gus "Goose" Ronald and Angharad "Rad" Yeo; which he hosted alongside Bendixsen until her departure in 2016. For these shows, he goes by the alias "Bajo". O'Donnell resigned from the ABC in October 2017, and departed Spawn Point in December.

In 2017, O'Donnell created and appeared in a Sci-Fi children's television show called Trip For Biscuits.

Other
In 2016, O'Donnell co-wrote two children's books with Bendixsen called Dig World  and Dragon Land. He began part-time streaming of video games on Twitch in March 2017, and became full-time following his resignation from the ABC in December 2017.

Credits

Film

Television

Bibliography

References

Further reading

External links

 Official web site
 
 
 About Steven "Bajo" O'Donnell on the official Good Game website
 About Steven "Bajo" O'Donnell on ABC3
 
 Good Game official website
 O'Donnell's official Instagram
 Stream on Twitch.tv

1980 births
Living people
Australian male film actors
Australian television presenters
New Zealand emigrants to Australia
Twitch (service) streamers
Video game critics
Australian writers